The Thái Bình river system is one of the two major river systems in the Red River Delta, Vietnam. (the other one is the Red River system). The system consists of 8 rivers flowing in northern Vietnam. This system joining with Red River system creates the Red River Delta.

Rivers of the system
Bạch Đằng River
Cầu River
Kinh Thầy River
Lach Tray River
Lục Nam River
Thái Bình River
Thuong River
Van Uc River

Geography of Vietnam
Rivers of Thái Bình province